Christian Palustran was born in 1947 near Paris, in Saint-Cloud. He is a French playwright and storyteller.

His works – some of which are written for youth – have been performed and broadcast in France and several other countries.

Biography 
Christian Palustran first lives in Paris. After completing his graduate studies at the Sorbonne university, he was appointed professor in Normandy. He puts on shows with his students and leads writing workshops from elementary school to university. At the same time, he launches himself into the creation of texts and two of his first works, Escapade and Story of an egg are awarded and staged at the National One Act Competition in Metz (France).

Christian Palustran has written some thirty plays of various genres. Many have been performed in France and in French-speaking countries. In Paris  and in other regions: North of France (Lille, National Dramatic Center for Youth), Provence (National Avignon festiva) etc.

Likewise, in Switzerland, in Canada  and in Belgium. In the latter country, A yellow Butterfly called Sphinx and The Misdeeds of Bourbon (Les Méfaits du Bourbon) represented France at the international CIFTA  Estivades (International Councel of Amateur Theater Festival) in Marche-en-Famenne. and  La Chausse-trape (The Trap), at the first Namur International Festival.

Some of his plays were broadcast on the airwaves (Radio Suisse Romande  and National cultural radio France-Culture ...).

Several have been translated into different languages and have been performed abroad: in the USA  (in New York where Escapade won a first prize), in Argentina  but also in  Great Britain  and in Eastern Europe (Russia, Bulgaria and Romania).

Among them, we can cite many satirical comedies in which he derides our time. He is also the author of tragic monologues  and social dramas.

Christian Palustran is interested in theater for young people. With false naivety or more directly, his works tackle contemporary problems, sometimes at the risk of surprising or disturbing (A yellow butterfly called Sphinx).

Keen on languages, he sometimes translates other authors or contributes to the translation of his texts. He also supports the Francophonie, the organization of countries with French as an official or important language. From 2009 to 2019, he has annually chaired the Francophone Festival La Première in Kirov, Russia.

Christian Palustran is also the author of several collections of tales: Le Crépuscule des fées (The Good People's Twilight), Les Contes du croissant de lune (The Tales of the Crescent Moon), and Métamorphoses, mon amour (Metamorphoses, My Love), a contemporary treatment of Ovid. Drawing inspiration from famous tales, these "strands of dreams", as the author calls them, often underline, ironically or facetiously, the flaws specific to our time. They were broadcast on various radio stations and were also said in public, at the National Festival of Storytellers of Chevilly-la-Rue near Paris and in various towns. They had for performers famous French actors  (Michel Bouquet, Claude Piéplu...).).

Works

Theater 
(For summaries, number of actors, places and dates of creation, see the list of plays in SACD Authors' Repertoire ).

For all audiences 

 Escapade (Escapade): first place winner at the International Playwrighting Competition, 1998, New-York City, 13th street Repertory Company. Translated by Frank Moorman.  L’Avant-scène Théâtre  n° 735/736, (FRBNF39768555)
Translated into English by Pauline Patman, La Fontaine, 1990 and 2002, trilingual version, French, English, Italian. Also translated into Romanian.
 Dogdaze (La Canicule): Reading/stage, New-York City, 13th Street Repertory Company,  August 2006. Translation by Frank Moorman. La Fontaine, 1991 and 2002 ().
 The diary of a were-wolf, Abyss and Cloud (Journal d'un loup-garou, Abîmes et Nuage): Lansman, 1996,.                                   Translation into English of The diary of a were-wolf by Frank Moorman. and of Abyss into Rumanian oby François Bréda                                                                                                               Broadcast of Dairy of a werewolf on Radio France-Culture (1991) and of Cloud on the Swiss Romande Radio (1990).
 Une Soirée tranquille, La Fontaine,1996,.
 Le Grand Débat (taken from Un Paradis d'enfer): translated into Bulgarian by A. Sougarev, Review Panorama n° 3, Le Théâtre français cotemporain (French contemporary theater), 1998.
 Citizen BV ou La Barbe Verte, Art & Comédie, 2001,.
 Le Paysan, le Roi et la Marmite, La Fontaine, 1992 and 2002,.
 Queneau, que si, collective work, Les Quatre Vents, 2003,.
 La Chausse-trape, La Fontaine, 1998 and 2004,.
 Les Méfaits du Bourbon, La Fontaine, 2004,.
 Un paradis d'enfer, with Théophraste ou le huitième ciel, Linda and L'Épreuve  in Théâtre pour appartements et petites scènes, Les Mandarines, 2006,.
 Ecco in Un autre regard, L'Agapante, 2008,.
 La Fontaine, le clown et les écolos, balade théâtrale, La Fontaine, 2010,.
 Les Télecrates, new edition (L'épreuve et Des Pâtes à la vinaigrette), ABS, 2001,.
 Mythomania, balade théâtrale, with Histoire d'oeuf (Story of an Egg) and Vente à domicile, Les Mandarines, 2020,.

For children and young adolescents 

 Story of an egg (Histoire d'oeuf), 1991 and 2020 (new edition), Les Mandarines,. Translated into English by Frank Moorman and into Russian by Marina Kokorina.
 The Cat's tale (La Queue du chat): a diptych with The Hood Case in Démocratie mosaique 4, Lansman, 2000,. Translated into English by Peggy Josset-Ralph  and into Spanish by Alejandro Finzi.
 The Hood case (L'Affaire Chaperon): a diptych with The Cat's tail) in Démocratie Mosaïque 3, 1998, and in Petites Pièces pour dire le monde, Lansman, 2005,. Translated into English by Peggy Josset-Ralph, into Spanish by Alejandro Finzi and into Russian by Marina Kokorina.
 Théâtre de Noël (Christmas Theater): The Surprise of Santa Claus, Story of the Star and the Ark, The War of the Trees, The Magician, Les Mandarines, 2004, Translated into Russian by Marina Kokorina and Sergei Khaletskiy.
 La Reine et l'Olifant magique (The Queen and the magic olifant) followed by Peau d'Âne 2000 (Donkey Skin 2000)  and  Concerto pour Lutin, Spectre et Ondine (Concerto for goblin, ghost and mermaid), La Fontaine, 2005,.
 La Soeur de Blanche-Neige (Snow White's sister), Art & Comédie, 2006,.

Author's Translations 

 A Christmas Carol: French translation of the play by Sandra Nordgren, theatrical adaptation of the Charles Dickens tale, Art & Comédie, 2000.
 The Secret of Deer Island and The Mischievous Child (theatrical adaptation of Hans Christian Andersen's tale) by Argentinian playwright Alejandro Finzi.

Stories

Radio-France cassettes 
 La Surprise du Père Noël (The Surprise of Santa Claus), 1987: printed in 10,000 copies for the operation "We are all Santa Claus" launched by France-Culture, France-Inter, and the magazine Pèlerin.
 Le Crépuscule des fées (The Twilight of the Fairies), 1993.

France-Culture and Radio Suisse Romande recordings 
 La Dame de glace, La Nouvelle Peau d'Âne, Le Procès du Petit Chaperon rouge (The Ice Lady, The New Donkey Skin,The Trial of Little Red Riding Hood).These three tales were also broadcast on Canadian Radio.
 La Surprise du Père Noël and Le Paysan, le Roi et la Marmite (The Surprise of Santa Claus and The Peasant, the King and the Pot),  4 episodes.
 Le Destin des arbres, Le Chat buté, Histoire de l'étoile de Noël, L'Ovni - 2 episodes; Concerto pour Lutin, Spectre et Ondine - 3 episodes (The Fate of the Trees, The Stubborn Cat, The Story of the Christmas Star, The UFO; Concerto for Goblin, Ghost and Mermaid), 1980, 1982 and 1984.

Publications 
 Les Contes du croissant de lune (Tales of the Crescent Moon), Art & Comédie, 2000.
 Concerto pour lutin, spectre et ondine (Concerto for Goblin, Ghost and Mermaid) in the review L'Encre et l'Oeuvre n° 206-207, Souffles, 2004.
 Métamorphoses, mon amour (Metamorphoses, My Love), after Ovid, Hachette jeunesse, 2005. This book is also transcribed in Braille (GIAA PACA / CORSE).

Bibliography 
 Répertoire du théâtre contemporain de langue française (Directory of Contemporary French-Language Theater) by Claude Confortès, Nathan, October 2000.
Romanian literary review Teatrul Azi (Today's Theater) from October 1997 
 Le théâtre jeune public, un nouveau répertoire (Theater for Young Audiences: A New Repertoire) by Nicolas Faure, Presses Universitaires de Rennes, 2009.
 Teatrul cetǎṭii - text anthology by Olimpia Mureṣan, eCreator, Romania, December 2020.

External links 

 Wikimedia commons

References 

Living people
1947 births
People from Saint-Cloud
21st-century French novelists
French dramatists and playwrights
Writers from Paris